Shmuel Horowitz may refer to:

 Shmelke of Nikolsburg (1726–1778), also known as Shmuel Shmelke Halevi Horowitz, early Hasidic Rebbes
 Shmuel Horowitz (publisher) (1903–1973), compiler and publisher of Chayey Moharan, a biography of Rabbi Nachman of Breslov

See also 
Shmuel Hurwitz (1901-1999), Israeli agronomist